Izatha psychra is a species of moth in the family Oecophoridae. It is endemic to New Zealand. It is classified as Nationally Endangered by the Department of Conservation. In 2020 it was feared that this moth was extinct as a result of a fire at the Pukaki Scientific Reserve, the last known locality of this species. However a 2021 survey found I. psychra present in the small portion of the reserve that was not damaged by the fire.

Taxonomy 
This species was first described by Edward Meyrick and named Aochleta psychra in 1884 using a male specimen collected by John Enys at Porters Pass. This type specimen is held at the Natural History Museum, London. George Vernon Hudson repeated Meyricks description in his 1928 publication The Butterflies and Moths of New Zealand. In 1988 John S. Dugdale assigned Aochleta psychra to the genus Izatha. Neither the larva nor the female of this species are known or have been described.

Description 
Meyrick described the species as follows:

It is possible to confuse this species with some of the greyish coloured species within the genus Tingena. However I. psychra can be distinguished as it lacks the antennal pecten of the Tigena species.

Distribution 
This species is endemic to New Zealand, and has only been found in the southern half of the South Island. I. psychra is only known from two localities, its type locality of Porters Pass where it has not been seen since the 19th century, and the small Pukaki Scientific Reserve near Lake Pukaki in the Mackenzie Basin.

Ecology and habitat 
Male adults are on the wing from January to February. In the one remain site where this species is known to exist, the Pukaki Scientific Reserve, the habitat is shrubland. The Pukaki Scientific Reserve was significantly damaged by fire in August 2020 and for a time fears were held that this may have resulted in the extinction of the species. However a survey completed in 2021 caught two adult males of this species, indicating its continued existence.

Host species 
The host species of this moth are unknown, however larvae are likely to feed on dead wood.

Conservation status 
Despite being given a level of protection by being classified as a Scientific Reserve, the lone shrubland site inhabited by I. psychra is vulnerable to wilding pine invasion and fire. As a result, this species has been classified under the New Zealand Threat Classification system as being Nationally Endangered. As at May 2021 conservation work is being undertaken to help protect the habitat of this moth after the devastating August 2020 fire at the reserve.

References

External links

Izatha psychra discussed on RNZ Critter of the Week, 5 March 2021

Oecophorinae
Moths of New Zealand
Endemic fauna of New Zealand
Taxa named by Edward Meyrick
Moths described in 1883
Endangered biota of New Zealand
Endemic moths of New Zealand